The 960s decade ran from January 1, 960, to December 31, 969.

Significant people
 Abd al-Rahman III caliph of Córdoba
 Otto I of Holy Roman empire
 Al-Muti caliph of Baghdad
 Al-Hakam II caliph of Córdoba
 Al-Mu'izz li-Din Allah of Fatimid dynasty
 Pope John XII
 Pope Benedict V
 Pope Leo VIII

References